The hadith of warning, also known as the invitation of the close families of Muhammad, is an Islamic tradition (hadith) that describes how the Islamic prophet Muhammad declared his prophetic mission for the first time by inviting his relatives to Islam. There are two versions of this hadith, both of which are linked to verse 26:214 of the Quran, known also as the Verse of Ashira. In one version, Muhammad's young cousin Ali is the only relative who offers his assistance to Muhammad, who then announces Ali as his successor, as reported by al-Tabari.

Verse of Ashira
Verse 26:214 of the Quran, known also as the Verse of Ashira, is directed at Muhammad:

Around 617 CE, some three years after the first divine revelation, Ibn Sa'd and Ibn Ishaq report that the Verse of Ashira commanded Muhammad to openly declare his prophetic mission for the first time by inviting his relatives to Islam. Zwettler suggests that this verse parallels Abraham's warning to his father in the same chapter of the Quran. There are two versions of this hadith, which might correspond to two separate attempts by Muhammad, though both attempts were reportedly thwarted by his uncle Abu Lahab.

Approaching enemy 
In the first version, Muhammad addressed his clan with a warning that likened the Judgement Day to a nearing enemy, as reported in Sahih Muslim. 

In other variations, Muhammad also warned his close relatives about the Judgement Day, saying that, "I possess nothing to your credit with God." These variations might have been independent statements later linked with the Verse of Ashira to lend more credibility to the idea of free will in Islam. Abu Lahab responded to Muhammad with abusive comments in the account transmitted by Ibn Abbas, retorting, "Damn you, is this what you called us for?"

Views 
The implication that even kinship to Muhammad does not secure salvation has an anti-Shia message in Rubin's view, since the Shia values the kinship of their Imams with Muhammad. Alternatively, Madelung believes that the families of the past prophets play a prominent role in the Quran. In particular, after the past prophets, he notes that their descendants are often selected by God in the Quran as the spiritual and material heirs to the prophets. Jafri is of the same opinion. 

At the same time, Leaman argues that merit is a Quranic criterion of membership in a prophet's household. Along these lines, Brunner and Madelung both observe that renegade members of the families of the past prophets are not excluded from God's punishment. In particular, Noah's family is saved from the deluge, except his wife and one of his sons, about whom Noah's plea was rejected in verse 11:46, "O Noah, he [your son] is not of your family."

Feast 
In the second version, Muhammad gathered his relatives for a meal and then invited them to Islam, as reported by the Sunni al-Tabari on the authority of Ali, via Ibn Abbas. In this account, Abu Lahab foiled Muhammad's first attempt by dispersing the crowd. On the second attempt, Muhammad announced:

Possibly the youngest there at the age of about fourteen, this account adds that Ali was the only relative who offered his assistance to Muhammad. In response, Muhammad put his arm around him and declared:

Al-Tabari writes that Muhammad's announcement was met with ridicule from Abu Lahab and the guests dispersed. As quoted by Abbas and Haider, the account of Ibn Ishaq is similar to that of al-Tabari. Ibn Hisham, however, omitted this tradition from his recension of Ibn Ishaq's Sira, possibly because of its Shia implications, according to Rubin. Muhammad's response to Ali in this tradition is also not included in the Sunni collection Musnad Ahmad ibn Hanbal. In contrast, Muhammad's response above appears in the Shia exegeses under the Verse of Ashira, including those by Qomi and Tabarsi.

Miracle 
Some accounts attribute a miraculous aspect to this event. For instance, the Sunni Ibn Sa'd narrates that Muhammad fed his guests with a single plate of food, which Abu Lahab dismissed as sorcery. In Ibn Sa'd's account, however, Muhammad rejects Ali's offer to help because of his youth. Muhammad's response is similar in the Sunni Musnad Ahmad ibn Hanbal.

Views 
Rubin writes that Ali's response to Muhammad's call contrasts the response of his tribe, the Quraysh. He adds that the early appointment of Ali as Muhammad's heir in this version supports Ali's right to succeed Muhammad, a central tenet of Shia Islam. Momen is of the same opinion. According to the Shia exegete Tabatabai, Muhammad made it clear that the first relative to accept his invitation would become his successor and inheritor. In this vein, Rubin also notes that the association of this account with the Verse of Ashira implies divine authorization. Burton comments that this banquet "won for [Muhammad] a proselyte worth a thousand sabers in the person of Ali, son of Abu Talib."

See also
 Ghadir Khumm
 Succession to Muhammad

References

Sources
 
 
 
 
 
 
 
 
 
 
 
 
 
 

Ali
Hadith
History of Islam
Life of Muhammad